Carroll is a town in Coös County, New Hampshire, United States. The population was 820 at the 2020 census. The two largest villages are Twin Mountain and Bretton Woods. Carroll is an important access point for recreational areas in the White Mountains, including many 4,000-footers, the Zealand River area, the Presidential Range, and the Presidential Dry River Wilderness. The town is home to the Mount Washington Hotel at Bretton Woods and to the Highland Center at Crawford Notch, the Appalachian Mountain Club's four-season lodge.

Carroll is part of the Berlin, NH–VT Micropolitan Statistical Area.

History
Land was granted by Governor John Wentworth on February 8, 1772, to Sir Thomas Wentworth, Samuel Langdon, and 81 others. Sir Thomas Wentworth resided in West Bretton, England, on his estate called Bretton Hall, after which the township was named "Bretton Woods". On the 1816 Carrigain map of New Hampshire, it appears as "Breton Woods". On June 22, 1832, the town was incorporated by the General Court as Carroll, in honor of Charles Carroll, a signer of the Declaration of Independence.

Although the surface is uneven and bounded by mountains, farmers found the soil "strong and deep". It has many small streams, tributaries of the Ammonoosuc River, which in the 19th-century were noted for abundant trout. By 1859, Carroll had a starch factory, and two lumber mills that produced boards, shingles, clapboards and laths. By 1874, the Wing Railroad, a branch of the Boston, Concord and Montreal Railroad, extended into the town.

But it is tourism that brought fame and prosperity to the area. Hannah and Abel Crawford turned their log cabin into an inn, then built the Notch House in 1828. In 1874, the Boston, Concord & Montreal Railroad reached Fabyan Station, an important junction joined the next year by the Portland & Ogdensburg Railroad. Here stood the Fabyan House, a grand hotel built by Sylvester Marsh and his colleagues, who also built the nearby Mount Washington Cog Railway. The hotel burned in 1951. The Mount Pleasant House was built in 1875, although demolished in 1939. But the grandest of all was the Mount Washington Hotel, built in 1902 and still operating. Here was held the 1944 International Monetary Conference, which resulted in the creation of the International Monetary Fund and World Bank.

Zealand

Zealand was a logging community within Carroll, established by James Everell Henry (1831–1912) . By 1884, Henry had started the Zealand Valley Railroad, which would extend about  into the forest. Zealand was a company town with various buildings including a boarding house, store, engine house, and a post office that operated from 1883 to 1897. After much lumber had been removed through clearcutting, Henry moved his operations to Lincoln in 1892. George Van Dyke then leased land and the Zealand mill from Henry, and constructed the Little River Railroad in 1893. Following a major fire in May 1897, and the removal of most remaining lumber, the railroad and ultimately Zealand were abandoned . A few remnants of the Zealand community can still be found.

Geography
There are several villages in the town.

Twin Mountain, which has a small airstrip, is primarily a summer and winter resort located at the intersection of U.S. Route 3 from Franconia and U.S. Route 302 from Bethlehem.
Bretton Woods is a year-round recreational and resort area on Route 302 southeast toward Hart's Location.
Adjacent to Bretton Woods at the junction of the Mount Washington Cog Railway Base Station Road with Route 302 is the former train station of Fabyan.
Two miles north of Twin Mountain along Route 3 is the small village of Carroll proper.

New Hampshire Route 115 leads from Carroll to Jefferson, with scenic views of Whitefield, Lancaster and the northern White Mountains.

The southeast corner of town boasts the Mount Washington Hotel and the height of land in Crawford Notch. The Ammonoosuc River rises at the confluence of several brooks and flows westward generally along Route 302 through town. The Saco River begins at Saco Lake in Crawford Notch and runs south-southeast to the Maine coast.

Carroll lies almost fully within the Connecticut River watershed, leading south to Long Island Sound; the southernmost tip of the town surrounding Saco Lake, however, is part of the Saco River watershed, leading east to the Gulf of Maine.

Demographics
As of the census of 2000, there were 663 people, 279 households, and 189 families residing in the town.  The population density was 13.2 people per square mile (5.1/km2).  There were 740 housing units at an average density of 14.7 per square mile (5.7/km2).  The racial makeup of the town was 98.79% White, 0.75% Asian, 0.15% from other races, and 0.30% from two or more races. Hispanic or Latino of any race were 0.60% of the population.

There were 279 households, out of which 24.4% had children under the age of 18 living with them, 56.3% were married couples living together, 7.9% had a female householder with no husband present, and 31.9% were non-families. 25.4% of all households were made up of individuals, and 10.0% had someone living alone who was 65 years of age or older.  The average household size was 2.34 and the average family size was 2.76.

In the town, the population was spread out, with 21.0% under the age of 18, 6.3% from 18 to 24, 26.7% from 25 to 44, 31.2% from 45 to 64, and 14.8% who were 65 years of age or older.  The median age was 43 years. For every 100 females, there were 103.4 males.  For every 100 females age 18 and over, there were 107.9 males.

The median income for a household in the town was $39,286, and the median income for a family was $45,227. Males had a median income of $27,426 versus $20,781 for females. The per capita income for the town was $18,734.  About 3.1% of families and 6.9% of the population were below the poverty line, including 4.8% of those under age 18 and 12.4% of those age 65 or over.

See also

 New Hampshire historical markers:
 Number 30: The Crawford Family
 Number 87: Crawford House
 Number 122: Mount Washington Hotel / Bretton Woods Monetary Conference
 Number 233: Zealand and James Everell Henry
 Number 274: Beecher's Pulpit
 Twin Range
 North Twin Mountain (New Hampshire)
 South Twin Mountain (New Hampshire)
 White Mountain art

References

External links
 
 Village of Twin Mountain
 New Hampshire Economic and Labor Market Information Bureau Profile

 
Towns in Coös County, New Hampshire
Berlin, New Hampshire micropolitan area
Towns in New Hampshire